Žarko Mihajlović (4 March 1920 – 16 September 1986) was a Yugoslav football coach who managed Red Star Belgrade, OFK Beograd, PAOK FC, Fenerbahçe, Ethnikos Piraeus, Apollon Kalamarias, Doxa Dramas, Karşıyaka, Qadsia SC, and the Turkey national football team. With Red Star he won first two league title for the club in 1951 and 1953.

He played for BSK Beograd.

References

External links
 
 

Serbian footballers
Serbian football managers
Yugoslav footballers
Yugoslav football managers
1986 deaths
OFK Beograd managers
Red Star Belgrade managers
Fenerbahçe football managers
Turkey national football team managers
Ethnikos Piraeus F.C. managers
PAOK FC managers
Apollon Pontou FC managers
OFK Beograd players
1920 births
Association football central defenders
Kuwait Premier League managers
Qadsia SC managers